The women's 200 metres at the 2005 World Championships in Athletics was held on August 10, 11 and 12 at the Helsinki Olympic Stadium.

Olympic gold medalist Veronica Campbell, Christine Arron and Kim Gevaert were the early leaders out of the blocks.  The powerful Campbell ran on the outside of her lane 7 and into the lane of Yulia Gushchina though she was so far ahead of Gushchina that she wasn't in danger of interfering.  Arron held the lead as Gevaert faded from contention.  Teenage sensation and Olympic silver medalist, Allyson Felix was more than a stride behind and slightly behind her was Rachelle Boone-Smith.  While Campbell corrected her heading, Felix began to go by, gaining on Arron.  Felix went by Arron and on to the win showing little strain.  Arron and Campbell strained to get to the line against each other.  Virtually unnoticed, Boone-Smith gained steadily and was able to nip both of them at the line with Arron holding on to beat Campbell for bronze.

Medals

Results
All times shown are in seconds.

Heats
August 10, 2005

Heat 1
 Cydonie Mothersill 23.72 Q
 LaTasha Colander 23.89 Q
 LaVerne Jones-Ferrette 24.12 Q
 Lauren Hewitt 24.20
 Sheri-Ann Brooks 24.20
 Yelena Bolsun 24.30
 Karin Mayr-Krifka 24.61

Heat 2
 Yulia Gushchina 22.53 Q (PB)
 Allyson Felix 22.68 Q
 Kim Gevaert 22.78 Q
 Natallia Solohub 23.16 q
 Maryna Maydanova 23.31 q
 Tracy Joseph Hamblet 24.84 (PB)
 Gertrudis Luna 26.28 (NR)

Heat 3
 Fabienne Féraez 23.72 Q
 Irina Khabarova 23.78 Q
 Rachelle Boone-Smith 23.78 Q
 Christine Amertil 23.88
 Vida Anim 24.16
 Mae Koime 25.31
 Gcinile Moyane 27.79 (SB)

Heat 4
 Christine Arron 22.89 Q
 Veronica Campbell-Brown 23.28 Q
 Lucimar Aparecida de Moura 23.36 Q
 Geraldine Pillay 23.58 q
 Alenka Bikar 23.77 q
 Mercy Nku 23.99

Semifinals
August 11, 2005

Heat 1
 Christine Arron 22.45 Q
 Rachelle Boone-Smith 22.69 Q
 LaTasha Colander 22.69 Q
 Cydonie Mothersill 23.13 Q
 Irina Khabarova 23.26
 Lucimar Aparecida de Moura 23.42
 Maryna Maydanova 23.78
 Geraldine Pillay 24.22

Heat 2
 Allyson Felix 22.90 Q
 Kim Gevaert 22.97 Q
 Veronica Campbell-Brown 23.02 Q
 Yulia Gushchina 23.10 Q
 Fabienne Féraez 23.29
 Natallia Solohub 23.62
 LaVerne Jones-Ferrette 23.62
 Alenka Bikar 23.94

Final
August 12, 2005

 Allyson Felix 22.16
 Rachelle Boone-Smith 22.31
 Christine Arron 22.31 (SB)
 Veronica Campbell-Brown 22.38
 LaTasha Colander 22.66
 Yulia Gushchina 22.75
 Kim Gevaert 22.86
 Cydonie Mothersill 23.00

External links
Official results - IAAF.org

200 metres
200 metres at the World Athletics Championships
2005 in women's athletics